The Philippine National Volleyball Federation sent representative teams in the 2021 Asian Men's and Women's Club Volleyball Championships under the name of Rebisco and Choco Mucho, brands of its sponsor Republic Biscuit Corporation. The teams don't belong to a domestic league with its players derived from the pool of the Philippine men's and women's national teams.

History

PSL All Stars

The Philippines under the previous national federation, Larong Volleyball sa Pilipinas (LVP) has been represented by non-club teams in official FIVB and AVC tournaments. Republic Biscuit Corporation which owns the Rebisco brand has been supporting Philippine volleyball since 2017.

The PSL All-Stars, a selection team from players of the Philippine Super Liga, was the country's representative at the 2016 FIVB Volleyball Women's Club World Championship in Metro Manila rather than a regular club side. That team played as "PSL-F2 Logistics Manila" which finished last among 8th teams in that tournament. The team featured again in the 2017 Asian Women's Club Volleyball Championship as "Rebisco-PSL Manila" due to a sponsorship deal with Republic Biscuit. The team likewise finished last at 8th place. The selection team has also participated in other tournaments in Thailand and the PSL Super Cup.

Rebisco and PNVF
The Philippine National Volleyball Federation succeeded the LVP in early 2021. In June 2021, the PNVF secured a three-year sponsorship deal with Republic Biscuit Corporation. The company pledged to support the federation's national team programs.

The PNVF entered the men's and women's national teams for the 2021 Asian Men's and Women's Club Volleyball Championships under the Rebisco name. For the women's competition, the federation will field two teams composing of national team players. The first team will composed of more established players and the second team will be a developmental side composed of younger players.

Originally, the PNVF planned to send two teams in that competition; the national team under the Rebisco brand and the Chery Tiggo 7 Pro Crossovers winners of the 2021 Premier Volleyball League Open Conference. However Chery Tiggo and all the other teams in the league declined to participate. The PNVF will instead field a second team composing of national team players instead. The second team was named Team Choco Mucho, after another brand of Republic Biscuit Corporation and shares the name with a PVL club, Choco Mucho Flying Titans.

Choco Mucho placed sixth in the 2021 Women's Club Championship, besting the Rebisco team which settled for seventh place.The men's Rebisco team on their part finished 9th out of 10 teams in their tournament.

Rosters

Men's

Source: PNVF and match #21 P–2

Women's

Rebisco

Sources: AVC and match #15 P–2

Choco Mucho

Sources: AVC and match #15 P–2

Competitive record

Men's

Asian Club Championship
 2021 – (Rebisco) – 9th place

Women's

Asian Club Championship
 2021
First team (Rebisco) – 7th place
Second team (Choco Mucho) – 6th place

Coaches

See also
PLDT HOME TVolution team – non-league men's and women's team formed specifically for the 2014 Asian Men's and Women's Club Championships
Philippines men's national basketball team in FIBA club tournaments – another national team which was entered in tournaments meant for clubs
Philippines men's national volleyball team – national volleyball team representing Philippines
Philippines women's national volleyball team – national volleyball team representing Philippines

Notes

References

Volleyball in the Philippines
Women's volleyball teams in the Philippines
Men's volleyball teams in the Philippines